Danny Wheelahan (28 January 1903 – 30 August 1991) was an Australian rules footballer who played with South Melbourne in the VFL during the late 1920s.

Wheelahan had a brief career with South Melbourne but won their Rohan Cup as the best and fairest player in 1929.  His brother Martin also played for South Melbourne.

References

External links

1903 births
1991 deaths
Australian rules footballers from Victoria (Australia)
Sydney Swans players
Bob Skilton Medal winners
Place of birth missing